Andrés Eduardo Díaz Durán (born 4 January 1995), is a Chilean footballer who currently plays as a central midfielder for Deportes Santa Cruz in Primera B de Chile.

Club career
Andres did all lower in Universidad Católica but his debut was in Deportes Valdivia.

External links

1995 births
Living people
Footballers from Santiago
Chilean footballers
Club Deportivo Universidad Católica footballers
Deportes Valdivia footballers
Club Deportivo Palestino footballers
Ñublense footballers
Deportes Santa Cruz footballers
Chilean Primera División players
Segunda División Profesional de Chile players
Primera B de Chile players
Association football midfielders